Bor Airport ( / Aerodrom Bor) is an airport located in east part of Serbia near the town of Bor, Serbia and around  from the bigger town of Zaječar, Serbia.The Airport is also located near the mountain resort Crni Vrh (Black Peak,  high) and many other tourist attractions like Brestovac Spa, the Stol mountain, Lazar's cave, Lazar's Canyon, Vratna Gates, Bor Zoo and the Gornjak monastery.

The Airport was built during 1984/1986. It is a civil airport for sports, and it is planned to be opened for commercial flights in the future.

The airport can handle light commercial and business planes at the moment. It remains one of the best small civil airport in Serbia. Airport has hangar, control tower, a saloon and accommodation for the crew members. In 2011 the new Aero klub Bor was founded, and there is now an effort to build a general aviation maintenance center and obtain light airplane for training and parachuting. The airport was operated by Aero klub Bor (Bor Aero Club) and Bor Sports Center. Sections of the Aero club include skydiving, parachuting, and training for pilots.

The club used to have one airplane Utva 75 and a few parachutists. The airplane crashed at Paracin airport in 1988. and was repaired, but it had another accident Bor airport in 1990. Later it was sent for maintenance to the factory in Pancevo, and later based in Batajnica.

In 1992. for a short period of time the airport was base for squadron of J-21 from Skopje Airport. Two Antonov An-26 were stationed in 1999. during the NATO bombing of Yugoslavia from Niš Constantine the Great Airport.

Reconstruction and development

In 2011 Belgrade Nikola Tesla Airport was creating a regional airport network in Serbia. Bor airport has been reconstructed and is now able to accept passenger aircraft. Bor Airport has a good runway, modern control tower and hangars. Belgrade Airport donated some equipment from Terminal 1 of Belgrade Nikola Tesla Airport.

Since 2012 Bor Airport is permitted for handling of light/medium aircraft, recreational and training flights. On 19 March 2012. the first aircraft, a Cessna 172 landed at the airport. This is the first aeroplane after a 15-year hiatus.

Bor plans to improve their facilities, especially on approach lights for night operation. Meanwhile, many business delegations used Bor Airport for landing.

Airport ownership

On 12 August 2020. it was announced that airport will change ownership to state owned, instead of being owned by the City of Bor. Airport operator was changed to Public Enterprise Airports of Serbia and relocation of the airport was announced in the next 10 to 15 years. Plan was to use the current location for mining and the new airport runway would be counteracted at a new location, with better or similar characteristics. Later was announced that the airport will not be relocated from its current location because the mining activities that are being carried out not far from it do not affect the airport operations.

Airlines and destinations 

Currently, there are no regular services to and from Bor Airport.

Statistics

See also
 List of airports in Serbia
 Airports of Serbia
 Transport in Serbia
 AirSerbia

References

 Aerodrom u Boru uskoro i za putničke avione (Blic, 21 March 2012)
 "Cessna 172" na borskom aerodromu (RTV Bor, 19 March 2012)
 Pista pala u zaborav (MEDIJA CENTAR BOR – Borski Info-centar, 28 September 2010)
 U kakvom je stanju vazdušna luka planirana za obnovu

External links
 World Aero Data on this airport
 Bor Airport photo gallery
 U Boru održan aeromiting
 Bor Airport information (PDF)

Bor, Serbia
Airports in Serbia